The Dr. Slump - Arale-chan anime series is based on the manga Dr. Slump by Akira Toriyama. It follows the life of inventor Senbei Norimaki and his family and friends, most notably the humanoid robot Arale. This article lists all 243 episodes, 7 specials and 3 educational films. For the 74-episode series that began in 1997, see List of Doctor Slump episodes.

The first 18 episodes (with the exceptions of episodes 7-10, 13, 14 and 17) as well as episodes 23 and 41 contain two 11-minute stories. The rest is just one full 22-minute story.

Series overview

Episode list

Season 1 (1981-82)

Season 2 (1982-83)

Season 3 (1983-84)

Season 4 (1984-85)

Season 5 (1985-86)

Educational Films and Specials (1983-2007)

References

Episodes
Lists of anime episodes